Music Speaks Louder Than Words is an album released by Epic Records in 1990.

Overview
Artists such as Cyndi Lauper, Atlantic Starr, Roberta Flack, Patti LaBelle, Earth, Wind & Fire, Anne Murray and the Cover Girls featured on the album.

The LP's songs were co-written by American and Soviet musicians and songwriters. A sum of composer royalties went towards the AFS Intercultural Exchanges programme. AFS Intercultural Exchanges is an international body based in 70 countries which places exchange students with host families.

Critical reception

Stephen Holden of the New York Times noted that "the album's songs are all slickly produced".

Track listing

References 

1990 albums
1990 compilation albums
Rock compilation albums
Epic Records albums
Epic Records compilation albums